Atalar (former Deliminnet) is a town in Tarsus district of Mersin Province, Turkey. The population is 1747  as of 2012.

References

Populated places in Mersin Province
Towns in Turkey
Populated places in Tarsus District